Sven Emil Lundgren (29 September 1896 – 18 June 1960) was a Swedish middle-distance runner who competed in the 800 m, 1500 and 3000 m events at the 1920 and 1924 Olympics. He had his best results in 1920, when he won a bronze medal in the 3000 m team contest and finished fifth in the 1500 m. He failed to reach the finals in all other events.
 
Lundgren won eight Swedish titles, four over 800 m and four over 1500 m, six of them in 1919–1921. From 1922 to 1926 he held the world record in the 1000 m, and from 1919 to 1925 in the 4 × 1500 m relay. In retirement Lundgren worked as warehouse manager in Stockholm.

References

1896 births
1960 deaths
Swedish male middle-distance runners
Olympic bronze medalists for Sweden
Athletes (track and field) at the 1920 Summer Olympics
Athletes (track and field) at the 1924 Summer Olympics
Olympic athletes of Sweden
Medalists at the 1920 Summer Olympics
Olympic bronze medalists in athletics (track and field)